A poulter is a person who looks after, sells or prepares poultry.

Poulter may also refer to:

People
Arthur Poulter (1893–1956), British Victoria Cross recipient
Dan Poulter (born 1978), British MP
Harry Poulter (1910–1985), English footballer
Hayden Poulter (1961–2018), New Zealand serial killer
Ian Poulter (born 1976), English golfer
Jordyn Poulter (born 1997), American Olympic volleyball player
Marlene Clark Poulter, American television soap opera writer
Paul Poulter, British Pickup Truck Racing driver
Ray Poulter (1929–1999), Australian rules football player
Sebastian Poulter, British legal scholar
Stephen Poulter (cricketer) (born 1956), English former cricketer
Thomas Poulter (1897–1978), American Antarctic explorer
Will Poulter (born 1993), British actor

Other uses
River Poulter, a tributary of the River Idle, Nottinghamshire, England
Poulter (officer), an officer in a mediaeval household responsible for poultry

Occupational surnames
English-language occupational surnames